The Washington Branch of the National Bank of Washington is a historic bank building located in Northwest, Washington, D.C.

History
The building was built in 1888 as a branch of The Bank of Washington. It was designed by James G. Hill and Daniel J. Macarty.

It was documented by the Historic American Buildings Survey.

In 1974, it was added to the National Register of Historic Places for its Romanesque and Richardsonian Romanesque architecture.

References

Commercial buildings on the National Register of Historic Places in Washington, D.C.
Richardsonian Romanesque architecture in Washington, D.C.
Commercial buildings completed in 1888